Royal Pains is an American comedy-drama television series that ran on the USA Network from 2009 to 2016. The series was based in part on actual concierge medicine practices of independent doctors and companies. The cast of the show included Mark Feuerstein, Paulo Costanzo, Reshma Shetty, Brooke D'Orsay, Ben Shenkman, Jill Flint, and Campbell Scott.

Series synopsis
The series follows Hank Lawson, a young emergency room doctor, who after being wrongly blamed for an important patient's death, moves to the Hamptons and becomes a reluctant house-call doctor to the rich and famous. When the administrator of the local hospital asks him to treat the town's less fortunate, he finds himself walking the line between doing well for himself and doing good for others.

Cast and characters

Main
 Mark Feuerstein as Dr. Henry "Hank" Lawson, a formerly successful New York E.R. doctor, who is fired from his job after a wealthy hospital benefactor dies in his care. When he saves someone's life during a trip to the Hamptons, he accepts an offer from Boris, a German businessman, to remain as a "concierge doctor" in the resort community. He usually attends to wealthy clientele, but also others in need of care and often without the means to pay. According to the episode "Keeping the Faith", he and his brother are Jewish.
 Paulo Costanzo as Evan Roth Lawson, Hank's younger brother. He is an accountant and self-appointed CFO of HankMed. Evan's job is to promote the HankMed business, at times using strategies that Hank finds inappropriate or too commercial. At the end of season 4, he marries Paige, the adopted daughter of a wealthy, conservative military man who is running for the United States Congress. When Boris buys Hampton Heritage in Season 7, he becomes a member of the board and the hospital's Acting Administrator.
 Reshma Shetty as Divya Katdare, Hank's physician assistant. She joins the team early and is invaluable to Hank. She initially has to keep her medical career a secret from her parents. Forced by her parents into an arranged betrothal to a childhood friend, she has finally broken free of their control and is living on her own. As of season 6, Divya has a daughter named Sashi, but is involved in a bitter custody dispute with Sashi's father Rafa.
 Jill Flint as Jill Casey (seasons 1–4; recurring, season 8), Hank's on again/off again girlfriend and an administrator at Hamptons Heritage, the local hospital. Jill works with Hank to open a small clinic while running the local community hospital. In the fourth season, after finally giving up on any chance of romance with Hank, she leaves the Hamptons to do relief work in Africa.
 Brooke D'Orsay as Paige Lawson (seasons 4–8; recurring, seasons 2 & 3), Evan's wife. Paige is the daughter of a wealthy, conservative former military officer with political aspirations who initially does not think Evan is good enough for his daughter. Paige and Evan meet when she hires him to play her pretend boyfriend, but their pretend relationship soon blossoms into a real one. In the season 4 episode "Who's Your Daddy?", she is revealed to be adopted, and in the season 4 two-part finale/special "Off-Season Greetings", she and Evan marry.
 Ben Shenkman as Dr. Jeremiah Sacani (seasons 5–8; recurring, season 4), was hired by Evan to be Hank's replacement during Evan and Hank's temporary halt to their business partnership; Sacani stayed on when Hank and Evan made peace. He is an accomplished researcher and excellent at his work, although he has an awkward bedside manner because of his limited social skills. Sacani is an heir to a vast fortune. He and Divya are best friends and Divya and Sashi move into his house in season 6, but their friendship is almost broken when Divya meddles in and unintentionally almost destroys Jeremiah's relationship with a woman named Viviana. In season 7, Jeremiah is conned out of a great deal of money from a former fellow college classmate.
 Campbell Scott as Boris Kuester von Jurgens-Ratenicz (seasons 4 & 5; recurring, seasons 1–3 & 6–8), a wealthy and titled German businessman who offers Hank and Evan his guest house, and is Hank's first client. Boris has a genetic disease he is determined will die with him, and which he fights with equal determination, often by seeking rare or risky treatments. Used to getting what he wants, Boris has a rigid code of conduct, which can at times put him at odds with Hank. In season 3 he has a son, Carlos with his wife Marissa. In Season 6, he buys Hampton Heritage, stating that he intends to settle permanently in the Hamptons, and convinces Hank, Evan, Divya and Jeremiah to become members of the hospital's Board of Directors but has a secret agenda.

Recurring
 Henry Winkler as Eddie R. Lawson, Hank and Evan's loving, ne'er-do-well father who left the boys when they were young. Accused of embezzlement, Eddie served a short term in prison and is now on parole, a best-selling author and has been rebuilding his relationship with his sons and his new-found daughter Emma.
 Anastasia Griffith as Dr. Emily Peck, an arrogant rival doctor who works with (and becomes briefly involved with) Hank. Emily is hired to substitute for Hank while he makes an extended visit to Cuba with Boris, and soon comes into conflict with Divya because of her arrogance and her detached approach to her patients.
 Michael B. Silver as Ken "Killer" Keller, a sports agent and Hank's former high school bully. While Hank is initially hostile to him they develop a mutual respect and friendship. By season 5 Keller joined HankMed as the practice's lawyer.
 Tom Cavanagh as Jack O'Malley, a pro golfer who was featured in the season-two episode "Mulligan" and later became a recurring character in season 3, as his friendship with Hank became more pronounced. Jack died in the season 3 episode "Hank and the Deep Blue Sea" which caused Hank to develop emotional trauma.
 Kyle Howard as Dr. Paul Van Dyke (nicknamed "V.D."), a staff doctor at Hampton's Heritage; Divya first meets him while moonlighting at the hospital. After a brief flirtation between Divya and him, Evan hires him as one of Hank's replacements during the temporary halt to the business partnership between Hank and Evan. Van Dyke's personality is very energetic and impulsive, which has gotten him into awkward situations professionally and socially. Van Dyke would later join the new HankMed. He had a pet rabbit of which he was very fond. He also has a slightly older fraternal twin brother named Daniel (nicknamed "D.V.D.").
 Anna George as Rubina Katdare, Divya's reserved and loyal mother. She follows the traditions of a traditional Indian housewife, a sympathetic ear to Divya's frustrations and a bridge to Divya's father. When Divya's father disowns her, Rubina secretly keeps a relationship with Divya. She is eventually inspired by Divya to follow her heart, which causes her to leave her husband and travel the world.
 Ajay Mehta as Devesh Katdare, Divya's strict and strait-laced father. He practically disowns Divya when she cancels her wedding with Raj (Rupak Ginn), but they reconcile once she becomes his nurse after he nearly drowns.

Episodes

Location
Principal production of the show's pilot occurred in the Hamptons. However, other locations throughout Long Island were used, with Oheka Castle being the most prominent. Although actually located 60 miles to the west, in Huntington, Oheka served as the Hamptons home of Boris, the German nobleman who offers his guest house to Hank and Evan. In later episodes, exterior and aerial shots of Oheka are used to introduce scenes in the guest house.

In one episode, a Long Beach drive-through convenience store, Dairy Barn, was used as a fictional hot dog stand; a sign can be seen in the opening of that scene. Also, several scenes were shot on the bay side of Point Lookout. Other places used as fictional Hamptons locations include Northport Village in the Town of Huntington, Old Westbury Gardens, Freeport's Nautical Mile, which served as the exterior and parking lot of Hampton Heritage Hospital (in one scene, Freeport's charter coat can be seen across the bay) Caumsett State Historic Park and Oyster Bay Town Hall, which was transformed into the entrance of the Hamptons Heritage Hospital emergency room. Catalina Beach Club in Atlantic Beach, New York was transformed for the pilot episode into the fictional Hampt Inn, the hotel Hank and Evan stayed in upon their arrival in the Hamptons. Downtown Locust Valley, another haunt of the wealthy on Long Island's Gold Coast, plays downtown East Hampton in at least one episode (where Evan and Paige go shopping), with interior shots in a store as well as street scenes.  Other areas of filming include Roslyn, New York and Manhasset, New York, where the North Hempstead, New York Town Hall was used as a police station.

For several beach scenes, West Neck Beach (Huntington) was used and a food shopping scene was filmed in Southdown Market in Huntington. Huntington Hospital was used for Hamptons Heritage Hospital.

Two episodes of the second season take place in Cuba, but were filmed in Puerto Rico. The third episode (Lawson Translation) of the fifth season is set and was also shot in Budapest, Hungary.

Development and production
The pilot was filmed on location on Long Island, New York in the spring and fall of 2008. The pilot was directed by Jace Alexander, who also filmed the pilot of Burn Notice, another USA Network show, which aired in the hour before Royal Pains. Andrew Lenchewski wrote the pilot and Rich and Paul Frank executive-produced the project, with Lenchewski co-executive producing and John P. Rogers producing. The series was then picked up for a 12-episode season.

Awards and nominations

Reception
Royal Pains has become one of the highest-rated shows on cable. The series premiere was watched by 5.57 million viewers, the highest series premiere for the USA Network since Psych in 2006. With episodes two and three watched by 5.59 million and 6.5 million viewers, respectively, it was the first show in five years to have viewership increase from week two to week three.

Ratings

Home media
Universal Studios Home Entertainment released the first season of Royal Pains in Region 1 on May 25, 2010, and released it in Region 4 on August 25, 2010. Season 2 was released in Region 1 on May 17, 2011. A DVD released on January 3, 2012, contained the first 10 episodes of the third season. The complete series is also available on iTunes.

The complete series was released on DVD by Mill Creek Entertainment on September 22, 2020.

Books
From 2011 to 2012, D.P. Lyle published two novels based on the television series, under Signet Books' Obsidian imprint.

Legal issues
On July 6, 2010, actor Hayden Christensen and his older brother Tove Christensen filed a lawsuit against USA Network in a Manhattan Federal Court. In the suit, the brothers claimed to have pitched  USA Network an idea for a new television series, called Housecall, which involved a concierge doctor who made house calls to the rich and famous. The two brothers also claimed that a USA Network executive told them, "prior to learning about Housecall, he was unaware of concierge doctors and that he thought it was a fascinating idea." A USA Network spokeswoman declined to comment on the lawsuit. On May 10, 2011, a Manhattan judge ruled not enough evidence was available to justify a breach-of-contract claim because the claim concerns "materials that are not copyrightable, such as ideas." The decision was reversed on appeal in June 2012, the court holding that Christensens' claims were not pre-empted by copyright law. The opinion stated, "There are several qualitative differences between such a contract claim and a copyright violation claim," and added that sister appellate circuits recently had come to this same conclusion. The case was settled in May 2013, with no details made public.

References

External links

 
 

2009 American television series debuts
2016 American television series endings
2000s American comedy-drama television series
2000s American medical television series
2010s American comedy-drama television series
2010s American medical television series
English-language television shows
Television series by Universal Content Productions
Television shows featuring audio description
Television shows filmed in New York (state)
Television shows set in Long Island
USA Network original programming